is a Japanese football club based in Aomori, the capital city of Aomori Prefecture. They currently play in the Japan Football League, the Japanese fourth tier of league football. Their team colour is blue.

History 
Founded in 1995, ReinMeer Aomori was managed by Aomori City Football Association, which picked players from existing clubs. The name was originated by the mix of two German, Rein (clean) and Meer (sea). The name was picked to symbolize the nature of Aomori. The logo features the main protagonist of Aomori Nebuta Matsuri.

In 2016, they played for the first time in Japan Football League (in which they are going to play their 8th season on 2023) and ReinMeer hopes to reach J1 League by 2030.

Stadiums

League and cup record 

Key

Honours 
 Aomori Prefecture League 1st Division
 Champions: 2008
 Tohoku Soccer League 2nd Division North
 Champions: 2013

Current squad 
As of 21 February 2023.

Club officials
For the 2023 season.

Managerial history

References

External links 
Official Website 
Official Facebook Page 

 
Football clubs in Japan
Association football clubs established in 1995
Sports teams in Aomori (city)
Japan Football League clubs
1995 establishments in Japan